Tyler Harding  (born 18 October 1996) is a British freestyle skier. He competed in the 2013 and 2017 FIS Freestyle World Ski Championships, and in the 2018 Winter Olympics.

References

External links

1996 births
Living people
British male freestyle skiers
Olympic freestyle skiers of Great Britain
Freestyle skiers at the 2018 Winter Olympics
Freestyle skiers at the 2012 Winter Youth Olympics